This is a list article about flags that have been used in areas of Ukraine controlled by Russia or pro-Russian forces during the Russo-Ukrainian War.

Donetsk People's Republic

The flag of the Donetsk People's Republic is claimed by the separatist authorities to be based on the flag of the Donetsk–Krivoy Rog Soviet Republic, whom they consider the "People's Republic's" predecessor. However, there is no evidence of any such flag in 1918, and it is most likely based on the flag of the International Movement of Donbass, an anti-separatist pro-Soviet organisation started at Donetsk University in August 1989 with the goal of opposing Ukraine's independence.

The black is commonly thought to represent the Black Sea or the coal industry in the Donbas region. The original DPR flag also featured a coat of arms of the republic that said "Donetsk Rus'" (Донецкая Русь) in the centre. It was identical to the eastern Ukrainian Donetsk Republic political party, while also retaining the words "Donetsk Republic". A more simplified white double-headed eagle variant was used more commonly by initial pro-Russian protesters since 7 April 2014 and then by separatists of the Donbas People's Militia.

By October 2014, a second main flag which carried the words "Donetsk People's Republic" (Донецкая Народная Республика) was created with an updated doubled-headed eagle that looked less similar to the Russian coat of arms. This flag appeared to be more prominently used by the state, even appearing on ballot boxes during the 2014 Donbas general elections. The simplified black, blue and red tricolor without inscriptions or coats of arms started being adopted by the state and military forces after 2017.

Colors

Luhansk People's Republic
There have been several flags used to represent the Luhansk People's Republic. The first flag featured a similar design to the flag used by the Donetsk People's Republic, the main differences being that the top stripe was light blue or azure, a color used in the 1950–1992 flag of the Ukrainian SSR, instead of black. It featured a different coat of arms, and it contained the words "Lugansk Republic" (Луганская Республика) in Russian. The original shade of light blue used for the top stripe may have been inspired by the shade of blue used in the flag of the city of Luhansk. The second was adopted at some point in October 2014, with an abbreviation of the state's local name replacing the aforementioned text. On 2 November 2014, the Republic adopted a new flag that resembled the previous flags but lacked the coat of arms.

Colors

The colors of the flag of the Luhansk People's Republic are determined by the "Law on the State Flag of the Luhansk People's Republic".

Russian-occupied Kherson Oblast

Kherson Oblast is an entity which Russia claims to be one of its federal subjects.

At the signing of the agreement on the accession of the Kherson Oblast to Russia, signed by Russian President Vladimir Putin and the Russian-installed head of the region Volodymyr Saldo, the flag of the Kherson region was seen, but in the middle of white stripe, there is the 1803 coat of arms of Kherson supported by golden oak branches and blue ribbons, and surmounted by the Imperial Crown.

Russian-occupied Zaporizhzhia Oblast
Zaporozhye Oblast is an entity which Russia claims to be one of its federal subjects. 

In the early months of the occupation, the coat of arms used by the occupational forces was originally a re-worded version of Ukraine's Zaporizhzhia Oblast. Though on 25 May 2022, it was replaced by the 1811 coat of arms of Aleksandrovsk, which was previously adopted by the city of Zaporizhzhia in 2003, with the magenta color associated with Cossacks replaced with red due to "historical" reasons.

At the signing of the agreement on the accession of the Zaporizhzhia Oblast to Russia, signed by Russian President Vladimir Putin and the Russian-installed head of the region Yevgeny Balitsky, the flag of the Zaporizhzhia region was presented as a bi-color field in green and red, and the 1811 coat of arms of Aleksandrovsk (Zaporizhzhia at the time) in the middle.

Historical separatist movements

Kharkov People's Republic
The Kharkov People's Republic (Russian: Харьковская Народная Республика) was a short-lived self-proclaimed state in Kharkiv, Ukraine. It was declared by separatists during the 2014 pro-Russian unrest in Ukraine. The separatists were led by Yevhen Zhylin. It was created on 7 April 2014 when pro-Russian protesters stormed government buildings in Kharkiv and declared the Kharkov People's Republic. It was dissolved when Ukrainian authorities regained control of Kharkiv several days later.

See also
Flag of Novorossiya
List of Russian flags
Flags of the federal subjects of Russia

References

External links 

Flags of states with limited recognition
Russian occupation of Ukraine